Sound is the fourth studio album by the British band Dreadzone. It was released in 2001 on Ruff Life Records.

Track listing
 "Return of the Dread" - (6:22)
 "Crazy Knowledge" - (5:20)
 "Mean Old World" - (6:02)
 "Black Rock and Roll" - (5:15)
 "Straight to a Soundboy" - (6:05)
 "Digital Mastermind" - (5:08)
 "Different Planets" - (7:19)
 "Dread'Pon Sound" - (6:42)
 "Believing in It" - (5:42)
 "The Last Dance" - (7:25)

Personnel
 Greg Roberts
 Tim Bran
 Leo Williams
 Rob Marche - guitar on "Mean Old World" and "Black Rock and Roll"
 Don Letts
 Sorel Johnson - vocals on "Believing In It"
 Brinsley Forde - vocals on "Return of the Dread"
 MC Spee (Spencer Graham) - vocals on "Return of the Dread"
 MC Det (Joseph Ellington) - vocals on "Black Rock and Roll"
 Earl Sixteen - vocals on "Digital Mastermind", "Different Planets" and "The Last Dance"
 Donna McKevitt - vocals on "Different Planets"
 Steve Roberts - guitar on "Believing In It"

Dreadzone albums
2001 albums